Hakuji no Hito is a 2012 Japanese film directed by Banmei Takahashi based on a novel by Emiya Takayuki. It was released in 2012.

Cast
 Hisashi Yoshizawa as Tagumi Asakawa
 Bae Soo-bin as Cheong-lim
 Jeon Su-ji as Ji-won

References

External links
  

2012 films
Films based on Japanese novels
Films directed by Banmei Takahashi
2010s Japanese films